Ramdin is a surname. Notable people with the surname include:

Albert Ramdin (born 1958), Surinamese diplomat
Denesh Ramdin (born 1985), Trinidadian cricketer
Victor Ramdin (born 1968), Guyana-born American poker player

See also
Ramin